Ecto is the fourth album by American singer-songwriter Happy Rhodes, released in 1987.

Overview

Rhodes' first four albums were not conceived and recorded as album releases, but were a gathering together of songs recorded at Cathedral Sound Studios from 1984 to 1986. When fellow musician Kevin Bartlett offered to release Rhodes' songs on his cassette-only personal label Aural Gratification, Rhodes culled through the songs she had recorded and ordered them to her satisfaction.

Originally released as a cassette tape, each copy sold was a 1 to 1 real-time dub.  Ecto was released on CD in 1992 with additional tracks. The bonus track When The Rain Came Down was uploaded to the file sharing network Napster by an unknown person, and misidentified as a duet between Kate Bush and Annie Lennox, two singers who (as of July 2007) have never worked together.

Track listing
All music, lyrics, voices, instruments and arrangements by Happy Rhodes.
"I'm Going Back" – 4:18
"If Love Is A Game, I Win" – 5:32
"Would That I Could" – 4:11
"Off From Out From Under Me" – 3:53
"Project 499" – 2:13
"I Won't Break Down" – 3:28
"If So" – 3:36
"Ecto" – 4:40
"I Cannot Go On" – 4:07
"Ode" – 4:10
"Don't Want To Hear It" – 4:56
"Poetic Justice" – 2:59
"To Be E. Mortal" – 8:15
"Look For The Child" – 5:54 (CD bonus track, previously unreleased)
"When The Rain Came Down" – 5:44 (CD bonus track, previously unreleased)

Personnel
 Happy Rhodes: vocals, guitar, keyboards

References

1987 albums
Happy Rhodes albums